Manon Vernay (born 7 January 1989) is a retired French-Australian handball player who last played for HSV Solingen-Gräfrath in Germany and on both, the Australian national team . Vernay is also an elite beach handball player who played for various EBT clubs in Europe and for Australia women's national beach handball team.

Vernay was recently best goalkeeper at the Handball Asian Championships in Kumamoto (2018) and represented Australia at the IHF Handball World Championships 2019 in Japan.

Awards
Beach Handball  : 
Australian Championships Best Goalkeeper : 2018, 2016, 2015
Australian Championships MVP (mixed cat) : 2016

Handball :
Oceanian Championships Best Goalkeeper : 2019, 2015
Oceanian Open Clubs Championships Best Goalkeeper : 2017

References

External links
Solingen-Gräfrath verstärkt sich mit australischer Torhüterin. Handball World 24 March 2018. (In German)
Fünf Abgänge beim HSV Solingen-Gräfrath. Handball World. 11 April 2018. (In German)
MIT MANON UND DEM GLÜCK DER TÜCHTIGEN. MTV1860 webpage. (In German)
12 Monkeys Köln BHC webpage. (In German)

Australian female handball players
Australian expatriate sportspeople in Germany
1989 births
Living people
Sportspeople from Brisbane